Digby Island is a small island immediately west of Kaien Island, which is the location of the city of Prince Rupert, British Columbia. The island is home to the Prince Rupert Airport and the small community of Dodge Cove. The island is named for Henry A. Digby, an officer on HMS Malacca.

Prior to European colonization, the island was occupied by the Tsimshian for thousands of years. The Tsimshian trickster, Txamsem, was believed to have been born on the island in the village of Kanagatsiyot, at the current site of Dodge Cove.

References

Islands of British Columbia
Prince Rupert, British Columbia
North Coast of British Columbia